The United States and Canadian Academy of Pathology, abbreviated USCAP, is the largest North American organization of pathologists. It is the publisher to two major pathology journals, Laboratory Investigation and Modern Pathology.

External links
 United States and Canadian Academy of Pathology website

Medical associations based in the United States
Medical and health organizations based in California
1906 establishments in the United States
Organizations established in 1906